Koho or K'Ho is a South Bahnaric language spoken by the Koho people and Mạ people, mainly in the Lâm Đồng Province of Vietnam. It is very close to the Mnong language.

The autonym of the Kơho people is kon cau while Koho is a Cham exonym.

Subgroups and dialects
There are at least twelve Kơho dialect groups for the area: Chil (Cil, Til); Kalop (Tulop); Kơyon (Kodu, Co-Don); Làc (Làt, Lach); Mà (Mạ, Maa); Nồp (Nop, Xre Nop, Noup); Pru; Ryông Tô (Riồng, Rion); Sop, Sre (Chau Sơre, Xrê); Talà (To La); and Tring (Trinh). Although Mạ/Maa is a Koho dialect group, the Mạ people identify as a separate ethnic group.

Phonology

Data below are from Olsen (2015).

Consonants

Initial consonants

 The phoneme /r/ is commonly a voiced alveolar trill [r] but also often reduces to a flap [ɾ] when it occurs as the second segment in a consonant cluster.

Final consonants

 Before the palatal finals /c/ and /ɲ/, there is an audible palatal offglide after the vowel [Vʲ], so that /pwac/ ‘flesh’ is pronounced as [pwaʲc] and /ʔaɲ/ ‘I (1st person singular)’ as [ʔaʲɲ].

Vowels

 Vowels contrast in length.

Morphology

Compounding
Compounding is a common way of coining new words in Koho. Some examples:
 muh mat ‘face’ < muh ‘nose’ + mat ‘eye’
 phe mbar ‘sticky rice’ < phe ‘husked rice’ + mbar ‘sticky’
 ôi ao ‘clothes’ < ôi ‘blanket’ + ao ‘shirt’

Affixing
One of the more productive prefixes in Sre is the causative tơn- , converts intransitive
verbs to causative verbs. If the prefixed verbs have a nasal initial, then the nasal cluster avoidance rule applied.

References

Sources
 

Bahnaric languages
Languages of Vietnam